/  is a single by Japanese girl group Melon Kinenbi. It was released in two versions, the first of which was released as an indies single in 2006, and the second of which was released as a major single in 2007. The major single release peaked at #50 on the Oricon weekly chart.

"Onegai Miwaku no Target/Crazy Happy!" was originally released in 2006 as a double A-side indies single. In 2007, Onegai Miwaku no Target was remixed and re-released as a major single, for which a PV was created. Crazy Happy! was later released as a bonus track on the coupling compilation album URA MELON. Onegai Miwaku no Target - Original new ver. was used as the ending theme of the TV Tokyo music programme Onryū ~On Ryu~.

On March 31, 2012, the idol group Up-Up Girls from Up-Front Agency released this with a new arrangement as the b-side to their indies debut single, Going my ↑.

Track listing

Indies Version

Crazy Happy!

Major Version

External links
Onegai Miwaku no Target (Major) at the Up-Front Works discography listing (Japanese)

2006 singles
2007 singles
Zetima Records singles
2006 songs